"People Who Love Peepholes" is the 179th episode and second episode of the ninth season of the American sitcom Two and a Half Men. It is also the second part of the two part premiere of the ninth season. The episode aired on September 26, 2011 on CBS.

Plot

Walden (Ashton Kutcher) buys the Harper beach house, and Alan (Jon Cryer) prepares to move in with his mother Evelyn (Holland Taylor). Walden asks Berta (Conchata Ferrell) to stay as a live-in housekeeper, an offer which Berta, being attracted to Walden, readily accepts. (She takes great pleasure in taking "Zippy's" room, even telling him her plan). Alan quickly becomes uncomfortable living with his mother again, as she essentially ignores Alan. Disgusting him further, Evelyn tells Alan to come check on her if the date she's going to have rough sex with "can't hear her safe word".

Walden stops by Evelyn's to drop off some of Alan's things he left behind (which are books on how to get women), and invites Alan to go out and do something. Alan, desperate to get away from his mother, quickly agrees. Walden begins talking about his wife, Bridget (Judy Greer), who has spurned him, driving more recklessly the more he dwells on the topic. This causes Alan to wet himself out of fear for his life. Eventually, the two pull up to Walden's mansion, where Bridget tells him to get lost. Alan is shocked Walden will not stand down and comply with his wife and is forced to help him hop the fence at his gate to get in. However, once Alan is dragged up with Walden, Bridget warns them she'll turn on the electricity, but Walden says she's bluffing. Terribly wrong, Walden and Alan receive a massive shock to their crotches and fall into Walden's lawn. They recover inside Walden's mansion, being nursed by Bridget. She complains that she is more of a mother than a wife to her husband, as Walden acts immaturely on a regular basis (the entire living room is filled with arcade games and game tables such as foosball). Bridget tells Walden that she does love him, but she couldn't stand the way they lived.

Alan and Walden leave, and wake up the next morning back in Malibu, drunk, naked, and sharing a deck chair and a blanket. Alan is at first horrified he might have done something he might regret, but Walden tells him they went skinny dipping. Further confused, Alan asks who would suggest it. Berta gives an answer from the next lawn chair, covered in a larger blanket. After getting dressed, Alan finds a girl in a bikini named Penelope (Stephanie Jacobsen) looking for Charlie. Alan tells her about his death, but that is quickly forgotten as she lays eyes on Walden. The two hit it off and Alan prepares to leave. However, Bridget stops by and Alan ends up saving Walden by claiming Penelope is his girlfriend (much to her disgust) and leading her out. Bridget then apologizes for acting harshly the night before, and offers to give Walden a chance to prove himself. Alan leaves, but is quickly stopped by Walden, who tells Alan that he will do any favor Alan wishes as a "thank you" for all the help Alan has given him. Alan asks to move back into the beach house with Walden, saying he will only stay until he can find another place. Walden agrees, and Alan quietly celebrates moving back in, fully intending to stay for good.

Production
This episode marks the third appearance of Judy Greer on the show. She appeared during the fourth season in the episodes "Smooth as a Ken Doll" and "Aunt Myra Doesn't Pee a Lot" as Judith's sister-in-law Myra. She also appeared during the third season of Lorre's sister show The Big Bang Theory in the episode "The Plimpton Stimulation" as Dr. Elizabeth Plimpton. Starting with this episode, Greer portrays Bridget, Walden's estranged wife. The episode had the show's third highest number of viewers ever and was the third episode to pull in over 20 million viewers.

This episode is also the last to use the original "Manly Men" theme song, the second version debuts in the succeeding episode "Big Girls Don't Throw Food" and is used until "Oh look Al Qaeda" (with one reuse in a season 10 episode, perhaps an error on the editor's behalf). The third and final version debuts in season 10.

Reception
The episode attracted 20.521 million American viewers and received a 7.2 18–49 rating. Including DVR ratings, which adds 3.56 million viewers, the episode was watched by 24.09 million viewers.

References

External links
 

2011 American television episodes
Season 9 Episode 2